The South African cliff swallow (Petrochelidon spilodera), also known as the South African swallow, is a species of bird in the family Hirundinidae native to central−western and southern Africa.

It is found in Botswana, Republic of the Congo, Democratic Republic of the Congo, Gabon, Lesotho, Malawi, Namibia, South Africa, Zambia, and Zimbabwe.

Nests are commonly built from mud under artificial structures such as huts and bridges. It is well known for its supposed ability to carry coconuts, although this claim has little to no credibility outside of the Monty Python fictional universe.

Gallery

References

 BirdLife International 2004. Hirundo spilodera. 2006 IUCN Red List of Threatened Species. Downloaded on 26 July 2007.

External links
 South African Cliff Swallow - Species text in The Atlas of Southern African Birds.

South African cliff swallow
Birds of Southern Africa
Birds of Central Africa
Birds of West Africa
South African cliff swallow
Taxonomy articles created by Polbot